Oliver Luke Cheshire (born 3 June 1988) is an English fashion model, designer and fashion entrepreneur.

Career  
Cheshire was born in Stevenage, Hertfordshire and grew up in Hitchin. His father was a fireman and Oliver aspired to be a firefighter or actor.

Cheshire was scouted by Select Model Management at the age of 15. Soon after, he gave up his drama studies for a career as a model and appeared in a campaign for Calvin Klein. Cheshire subsequently modelled for Jack Wills, Dolce & Gabbana, Versace, Orlebar Brown, Stella McCartney, Missoni, Hackett, Abercrombie & Fitch, Hollister Co., Vivienne Westwood, Gap Inc. and Marks and Spencer. Marks and Spencer reported a fifty per cent increase in the sale of men's swimwear while Cheshire was fronting their campaign. 

Over the years Oliver has graced the covers of many prestigious publications including L’Officiel Hommes, Attitude, The Journal, Men’s Folio, D’Scene, Exalt, 7th Man, Out Magazine, GQ Style.

Cheshire is regularly heralded in GQ.com’s best-dressed poll in the US and UK, as well as Grazia, The Telegraph and Tatler magazine. GQ USA have also featured Oliver on their best dressed list (the only British model to be featured). 

As an industry favourite, he has received awards for `International Model of the Year` from GQ Turkey and two awards from Attitude for “Most Stylish Man” and “Best Groomed Man.” Oliver is one of Mr Porter’s “Style Councillors” and a recognised supporter of LFWM.

As a writer, Cheshire has reported on Men's Fashion Week for GQ magazine and the telegraph  In 2015, he was named one of GQs 50 best dressed British men.

Already one of the most recognisable faces in Men’s fashion, 2019 Oliver add to his sartorial resume with the launch of his menswear fashion label Che, drawing inspiration from his 15 years in the industry. Recently launching CHE's SS21 collection and campaign, Oliver's brand is received well by both customers and the industry press validating Oliver’s skills as a designer with an eye on the future of fashion.

Personal life
Cheshire has been in a relationship with singer-songwriter Pixie Lott, reportedly since 2010. The pair were engaged in November 2016. They were married at Ely Cathedral on 6 June 2022, following a delay due to COVID-19.

References

External links
 Select Model Management.
 Oliver Cheshire at models.com.

Living people
1988 births
English male models
People from Hitchin
Select Model Management models